Ogibalovo is the name of several rural localities in Russia:
Ogibalovo, Kaluga Oblast, a village in Yukhnovsky District of Kaluga Oblast
Ogibalovo, Mikhaylovsky District, Ryazan Oblast, a selo in Ivankovsky Rural Okrug of Mikhaylovsky District in Ryazan Oblast
Ogibalovo, Ryazansky District, Ryazan Oblast, a village in Iskrovsky Rural Okrug of Ryazansky District in Ryazan Oblast
Ogibalovo, Tver Oblast, a village in Likhachevskoye Rural Settlement of Krasnokholmsky District in Tver Oblast
Ogibalovo, Vologodsky District, Vologda Oblast, a village in Pudegsky Selsoviet of Vologodsky District in Vologda Oblast
Ogibalovo, Vozhegodsky District, Vologda Oblast, a village in Ogibalovsky Selsoviet of Vozhegodsky District in Vologda Oblast